Spicules are tiny glass flakes which are formed during the manufacture of glass vials. A glass tube is extruded at a constant rate and a jet of water applied to the hot glass is used to cut the blank tube to length. The bottom and lip of the vial are formed by swagging or upset forming while the glass is still hot.

Spicules are formed in a cloud when the glass explodes from the contact of the cold jet. These are held to the glass blank during forming, and if the vial is not reheated or cleaned after manufacture, these spicules can drift off into the mixture subsequently placed in the vial. This is a serious problem in the manufacture of soft contact lenses or pharmaceutical products.

Glass engineering and science